Francisco María Yglesias Llorente (October 28, 1825 – November 8, 1903) was a Costa Rican politician and historian. He was born in Cartago, Costa Rica, on October 28, 1825 and died in San Jose, Costa Rica on November 8, 1903. He was the son of Joaquin de Yglesias Vidamartel and Petronila Llorente y Lafuente, sister of the first Bishop of Costa Rica Anselmo Llorente y Lafuente. He married in San Jose, Costa Rica on October 4, 1878 with his niece Enriqueta Tinoco Yglesias.

Yglesias Llorente graduated as Bachelor in Law from the University of San Marcos, Seville. During the government of Juan Rafael Mora Porras he suffered an exile for political reasons. He was Secretary of Foreign Relations and Public Instruction of Costa Rica from 1861 to 1863, and held other government positions, among them those of Deputy and President of the Constitutional Congress and Minister of Costa Rica in Great Britain. Yglesias Llorente published several historical works, including Pro Patria and the collection Later Documents of Independence.

1825 births
1903 deaths
People from Cartago Province
Vice presidents of Costa Rica
Government ministers of Costa Rica
Costa Rican exiles
Foreign ministers of Costa Rica